Welling Station is a hamlet in southern Alberta, Canada within Cardston County.

Demographics 
The population of Welling Station according to the 2008 municipal census conducted by Cardston County is 18.

Historic site 
Welling Station is the historic site of rodeo's first side-delivery bucking chute.  In 1916, rancher John W. Bascom and his sons moved to Welling Station, running cattle along Pot Hole Creek.  The family produced weekend rodeos on the Bascom Ranch where they designed and made their bucking chute.  Bascom and his sons - Raymond "Tommy", Melvin, Earl and Weldon - have all been honored in Canada and the United States in halls of fame as rodeo pioneers and for their contributions to the sport of rodeo.
Earl Bascom later became a famous western artist and sculptor.

See also 
List of communities in Alberta
List of hamlets in Alberta

References 

Cardston County
Hamlets in Alberta